Parannavalasa is a village and panchayat in Salur mandal, Parvathipuram Manyam district of Andhra Pradesh, India.

There is a railway station at Parannavalasa in the Salur-Bobbili branch railway line.

Demographics
According to Indian census, 2001, the demographic details of Parannavalasa village is as follows :
 Total Population: 	466 in 103  Households
 Male Population: 	240 and Female Population: 	226
 Children Under 6-years of age: 	59 (Boys - 	31 and Girls -	28)
 Total Literates: 	254

References

Villages in Parvathipuram Manyam district